Träd, Gräs & Stenar ("Trees, Grass and Stones") is a Swedish rock band formed in 1969, from previous incarnations Pärson Sound, International Harvester and Harvester. The group was one of the front acts of the Swedish progg scene, although noticeably less political than their contemporary counterparts. Their sound has been described as raw, psych rock jam, by the writer David Pescovitz, who also notes the band would invite their audiences to improvise and collaborate.

Background

Pärson Sound, International Harvester and Harvester
The band Pärson Sound was formed during the summer of 1967 by members of progg band Mecki Mark Men. Then original line up  consisted of Bo Anders Persson (guitar), Thomas Tidholm (vocals, saxophone, flute), Arne Ericsson (cello), Urban Yman (violin), Torbjörn Abelli (bass) and Thomas Mera Gartz (drums). Inspired by the minimalist music of Terry Riley, the plan explored drones, heavy repetition and use of tape loops. This constellation, which were playing an experimental style of psychedelic rock never released any official records, although a collection of recordings from 1967-1968 were released as the double CD Pärson Sound (1967-68) in 2001 and as a 3 LP deluxe box set on the record label Subliminal Sounds in 2010. In August 1968 the band changed their name to "International Harvester" and later the same year their debut album Sov gott Rose-Marie was released. In 1969 the name was shortened to "Harvester", under which the album Hemåt was released. In addition to music, the band was involved with Happenings, art and theater as part of a larger group collective.

Träd, Gräs & Stenar
In the summer of 1969 the band reformed as Träd, Gräs & Stenar, now consisting of Bo Anders Persson (guitar, vocals), Torbjörn Abelli (bass, vocals), Arne Ericsson (now on keyboards and occasionally still cello) and Thomas Mera Gartz (drums, vocals); Thomas Tidholm left the band as he deemed their new material too commercial. 1970 saw the release of their self-titled debut Träd, Gräs & Stenar, sometimes called "the green album", which included cover versions of Bob Dylan's "All Along the Watchtower" and The Rolling Stones' hit song "(I Can't Get No) Satisfaction". After the release of their debut album, they were joined by guitarist and vocalist Jakob Sjöholm.

Träd, Gräs & Stenar, then consisting of Bo Anders Persson, Torbjörn Abelli, Thomas Mera Gartz, and Jakob Sjöholm, toured the United States in 2004 and 2005.  Reine Fiske joined in 2008, on guitar.  Abelli and Gartz died in 2010 and 2012, respectively, and were replaced by Sigge Krantz (bass, 2010) and Nisse Törnqvist (drums, 2012).  Träd, Gräs & Stenar, now consisting of Jakob Sjöholm (guitar), Reine Fiske (guitar), Sigge Krantz (bass), and Hanna Österberg (drums), are touring as Träden in Scandinavia and the United States in 2018.

Discography

As "Pärson Sound"
 Pärson Sound (1967–68) (CD – 2001)
 Pärson Sound 3 LP Box Set (LP – 2010)

As "International Harvester"
 Sov gott Rose-Marie (LP – 1968)

As "Harvester"
 Hemåt (LP – 1969)

Träd, Gräs & Stenar
 Träd, Gräs & Stenar (1970 – LP; reissued by Anthology Recordings with bonus tracks)
 Djungelns Lag (The Law of the Jungle) (live; 1971 – LP; reissued 2016 by Anthology Recordings with bonus tracks)
 Rock för Kropp och Själ (1972 – LP)
 Mors Mors (Hi, How Are You?) (live; 1972 – LP; reissued 2016 by Anthology Recordings with bonus tracks)
 Gärdet 12.6.1970 (1996 – CD)
 Ajn, Schvajn, Draj (One, Two, Three) (2002 – CD)
 Hemlösa Katter (Homeless Cats) (2009 – CD, Gåshud)
 Kom Tillsammans (Come Together) (live; 2016? Anthology Recordings; "from the same 1972 recordings as Mors Mors")
 Tack För Kaffet (So Long) (2017 – CD)
 Träden (2018, Subliminal Sounds)

Personnel
Original Träd, Gräs & Stenar personnel
Thomas Mera Gartz – drums, vocals (1969–1972, 1980–1981, 1995–2012; died 2012)
Bo Anders Persson – guitar, vocals (1969–1972, 1980–1981, 1995–2008)
Torbjörn Abelli – bass (1969–1972, 1980–1981, 1995–2010; died 2010)
Arne Ericsson – keyboards, cello (1969–1972, 1980–1981)

Current (2018) personnel
Jakob Sjöholm – guitar, vocals (1970–1972, 1980–1981, 1995– )
Reine Fiske – guitar, vocals (2008– )
Hanna Österberg – drums, vocals (2017?– )
Sigge Krantz – bass, vocals (2010– )

Timeline

References

See also
Träd, Gräs och Stenar's MySpace Page 
Video of live performance for the Dearraindrop art opening at the Loyal Gallery in 2006
Träd, Gräs och Stenar's BandCamp Page

Swedish progressive rock groups
Swedish psychedelic rock music groups